The Wolf GB08 is a series of sports prototype race cars, designed, developed, and built by Italian manufacturer Wolf Racing Cars, for various forms of motorsports, like hillclimbing and sports car racing, produced by the company since 2010.

References

Sports prototypes
Le Mans Prototypes